Lucas Gabriel Ochandorena (born 4 March 1985) is an Argentine football coach and former player who played as a defender.

Playing career
Born in La Plata, Ochandorena made his senior debut with Villa San Carlos in 2006. He also played for La Plata FC during the 2007–08, before returning to Villa San Carlos and becoming a regular starter.

In 2012, Ochandorena moved to Ferrocarril Midland. He featured regularly before suffering an anterior cruciate ligament injury in May 2013; he subsequently never played professional football again.

Coaching career
After retiring, Ochandorena joined the staff of his former club Villa San Carlos in 2014, as an assistant. He then moved to Banfield in 2016 as an analyst of the youth sides, before returning to Villa San Carlos in October of that year.

In July 2017, Ochandorena became Lucas Nardi's assistant at Quilmes. He was also under the same role at Los Andes and Colón before moving to Ecuador in October 2020, as the assistant of Guillermo Duró at Deportivo Cuenca.

On 21 December 2021, Ochandorena joined Fabián Bustos' staff at Barcelona SC as his assistant, and also followed Bustos to Santos under the same role the following March. On 12 May, he was in charge of the latter club in a 3–0 Copa do Brasil home win over Coritiba, as Bustos was suspended.

Managerial statistics

References

External links
 
 

1985 births
Living people
Footballers from La Plata
Argentine footballers
Association football defenders
Primera B Metropolitana players
Primera C Metropolitana players
Torneo Argentino A players
Club Atlético Villa San Carlos footballers
La Plata FC footballers
Club Ferrocarril Midland players
Argentine football managers
Santos FC non-playing staff
Argentine expatriate footballers
Argentine expatriate sportspeople in Ecuador
Argentine expatriate sportspeople in Brazil
Expatriate football managers in Ecuador
Expatriate football managers in Brazil